The 1995 Ais Gill rail accident occurred near Aisgill, Cumbria, UK, at about 18:55 hrs on 31 January 1995 when a class 156 Super-Sprinter was derailed by a landslide on the Settle-Carlisle Railway line and was subsequently run into by a similar train travelling in the opposite direction.  The Guard of the first train was fatally injured in the collision.

Events
A Class 156 Super-Sprinter formed the 1626 Carlisle to Leeds via Settle service (headcode 2H88). It could only proceed as far as Ribblehead railway station, about 12 miles north of Settle, as the lines from Ribblehead to Settle were blocked by flooding; so it had to return to Carlisle. It was dark and raining heavily.

Near Aisgill Summit itself the train hit a landslide. It derailed across both tracks, and the cabin lights went off. The injured driver managed to radio Crewe Control Room. The conductor escorted passengers into the rear unit, which was across the northbound track. He then returned to see the driver who was still in the cab. Either the conductor or the driver (it is not known which) changed the lights from white to red to warn oncoming trains of the obstruction but no other action was taken.

Meanwhile, another Super-Sprinter train forming the 1745 Carlisle to Leeds service (headcode 2H92) had set off from Kirkby Stephen railway station around five miles to the north. About a quarter of a mile before the derailed train, the driver saw its red lights and made an emergency brake application, but there was no chance of stopping before impacting the derailment. The collision killed the conductor of the derailed train, and seriously hurt several passengers: 30 people on the trains suffered some kind of injury. The signalman at Settle Junction signal box was informed of the accident by the conductor of the 2H92 service and the emergency services were then alerted.

Inquiry
The official inquiry concluded that the conductor of 2H88 failed in his paramount duty to protect his train in the event of an incident by laying down detonators and displaying a red flag one mile from the obstruction.  The time between the initial derailment and the subsequent collision was about six or seven minutes which would have allowed a much greater warning time to be given to the second train, and might have prevented the collision or at least reduced its impact. The inquiry noted that a transcript of the call made from the driver of the train that hit the landslide. In his communications with the control centre at Crewe, the call ended with a control saying "we will take care of all of that, driver." This may have given the false impression that the southbound service that hit the first stricken service, would be warned appropriately and so the guard set about tending to the needs of his passengers. The chairman of the inquiry, Mr E N Clarke, said that protecting the train should have been the priority of the guard.

Further recommendations were made concerning the inadequate communications between Railtrack Control Rooms and inefficient use of the National Radio Network.  A "group call" to all trains in the vicinity of the incident could have been made by the Control Room and might have alerted the second train to the obstruction in time to prevent the collision.

Other incidents
In 1999 a similar incident occurred on the Settle and Carlisle line at Crosby Garrett, north of Kirkby Stephen, where a landslide caused a Carlisle-bound Sprinter to derail. The driver set off a warning horn mounted on the track, and although a southbound goods train hit the Sprinter, nobody was seriously hurt. This took place during bad weather conditions similar to the 1995 incident.

References

Sources

External links
 HSE Report - Rail Accident Near Ais Gill

Railway accidents and incidents in Cumbria
Railway accidents in 1995
1995 in England
History of Cumbria
January 1995 events in the United Kingdom
1990s in Cumbria
Mallerstang